Indian Institute of Research in Numismatic Studies is located near the town of Nasik in Maharashtra state of India. Known locally as the Coin Museum or Money Museum, it is primarily a research centre with one wing dedicated to a public gallery.

Description
The Institute was founded in 1980 with the efforts of numismatist Parmeshwari Lal Gupta and industrialist K. K. Maheshwari. It moved to its current location at Anjaneri near Nasik in 1984. It is operated by Indian Numismatic Historical and Cultural Research Foundation (INHCRF), a registered Trust under Maharashtra government. The Trust also operates Indian Rock Art Research Centre, established in 2005.

The aims of the Institute are to promote study and research in numismatics, by supporting scholars and university researchers and providing training to them. The Institute also houses a museum and a library.

Facilities 
They have trained researchers who have specialized on different numismatic periods, such as ancient, early medieval, medieval and late medieval. They offer services (free of cost) to any enquiry, made through the mail or otherwise, on academic aspect of any coin or coin series found in India. They also have a well equipped library having a good collection of numismatic and allied books.

Museum and library 
The gallery has two displays. The first is a small display on the money of India drawn from the collection of the institute. The second is a display of the photographic work of K G Maheshwari.

The IIRNS has the most important numismatic library in India. Available for use by scholars (the Institute also has guest houses) it includes both Indian and non-Indian numismatic works as well as slides, file cards, and other records of numismatic collections. The library also houses photo cardexes of coins (arranged series-wise) numbering approximately 1,50,000. Any scholar or lay individual is most welcome to visit them and take advantage of their facilities. They have a Scholars’ Residence with all modern amenities within their campus, which is open (at a nominal charge) to anybody desirous of doing research / study on coins at their Institute.

Publications
The institute publishes books and journals on a variety of subjects but primarily in numismatics. It publishes the Numismatic Digest, an annual publication. It also publishes proceedings international colloquia (conducted in 1987, 1991 and 2001). Sample publications of the Institute include:
 K. K. Maheshwari and K. W. Wiggins, Maratha Mints and Coinage (1989).
 Amiteshwar Jha and Sanjay Garg, A Catalogue of the Coins of the Katoch Rulers of Kangra (1991).
 Amiteshwar Jha and Dilip Rajgor, Studies in the Coinages of the Western Ksatrapas (1994).
 Paul Murphy, Kosala State Region,  600–470 BC: Silver Punchmarked Coinages

References

External links
 - Details of Publications

Museums in Maharashtra
Numismatic museums in India
Tourist attractions in Nashik
Buildings and structures in Nashik